Nebria lyubechanskii is a species of ground beetle in the Nebriinae subfamily that can be found in southwest Tuva and Tsagan-Shibetu regions of Russia.

References

lyelli
Beetles described in 2008
Beetles of Europe
Endemic fauna of Russia